Johnny Anderson is an American politician and a former Republican member of the Utah House of Representatives. He represented District 34 from his November 25, 2009 appointment to fill the vacancy caused by the resignation of Representative Kory Holdaway until January 2017. He announced he would not seek re-election after the 2016 legislative session.

Early life and career
Anderson earned his BS in business management from the University of Phoenix. He owns a chain of daycares and lists his profession as an early childhood educator and small business owner. He currently lives in Taylorsville with his wife Sharon and six children, including his daughter Katlynn. His family also includes his  nephew, Dallin Anderson.

Political career
2014 Anderson was unopposed in the Republican convention and won the general election with 3,901 votes (53.4%) against Democratic nominee Karen Kwan.
2012 Anderson was unopposed for the June 26, 2012 Republican primary and won the November 6, 2012 general election with 6,255 votes (53.4%) against Democratic nominee Celina Milner.
2010 Anderson was unopposed for the June 22, 2010 Republican primary and won the November 2, 2010 general election with 3,989 votes (62.2%) against Democratic nominee Clover Meaders.

During the 2016 legislative session, Anderson was on the Business, Economic Development, and Labor Appropriations Subcommittee, the House Political Subdivisions Committee and the House Transportation Committee.

2016 sponsored legislation

Anderson passed four the nine bills he introduced, giving him a 44.4% passage rate. He also floor sponsored four Senate bills.

References

External links
Official page at the Utah State Legislature
Campaign site

Johnny Anderson at Ballotpedia
Johnny Anderson at OpenSecrets

Place of birth missing (living people)
Year of birth missing (living people)
Living people
Republican Party members of the Utah House of Representatives
People from Taylorsville, Utah
University of Phoenix alumni
21st-century American politicians